The history of {{nihongo|sushi|すし, 寿司, 鮨||extra= or }} began with paddy fields, where fish was fermented with vinegar, salt and rice, after which the rice was discarded. In the Muromachi period (1336–1573), people began to eat the rice as well as the fish. During the Edo period (1603–1867), vinegar rather than fermented rice began to be used. The dish has become a form of food strongly associated with Japanese culture.

The inventor of modern sushi is believed to be Hanaya Yohei, who invented nigiri-zushi, a type of sushi most known today, in which seafood is placed on hand-pressed vinegared rice, around 1824 in the Edo period. It was the fast food of the chōnin class in the Edo period.

Early history 

The prototypical  is made by lacto-fermenting fish with salt and rice in order to control putrefaction. In Japan the dish's distribution overlaps with the introduction of wet-field rice cultivation during the Yayoi period. Passages relate ancient Japanese people with legendary King Shao Kang ruling over the Yangtze delta:Men great and small, all tattoo their faces and decorate their bodies with designs. From olden times envoys who visited the Chinese Court called themselves "grandees" []. A son of the ruler Shao Kang of Xia, when he was enfeoffed as lord of Kuaiji, cut his hair and decorated his body with designs in order to avoid the attack of serpents and dragons. The Wa, who are fond of diving into the water to get fish and shells, also decorated their bodies in order to keep away large fish and waterfowl. Later, however, the designs became merely ornamental.

During the third century, Chinese travelers in Japan recorded examples of Wu traditions including ritual teeth-pulling, tattooing and carrying babies on backs. Other records at the time show that Japan already had the same customs recognized today. These include clapping during prayers, eating from wooden trays and eating raw fish (also a traditional custom of Jiangsu and Zhejiang before pollution made this impractical).

 appears in the Chinese dictionary in the second century CE as the character , which was during a period in which the Han Chinese were expanding south of the Yangtze river, adopting the food from the non-Han peoples. , sashimi, and  can be traced back to Dongyi, a pre-Han Baiyue cultural area in East China. Confucius was born near present-day Nanxin Town, Qufu, Shandong, China, and he was known to have enjoyed eating raw meat.

One common story of the origin of  origins is of the chef Hanaya Yohei (1799–1858), who invented or perfected the technique in 1824 at his shop in Ryōgoku.

Sushi in Japan 
For almost the next 800 years, until the early 19th century, sushi slowly changed and the Japanese cuisine changed as well. The Japanese started eating three meals a day, rice was boiled instead of steamed, and of large importance was the development of rice vinegar. While sushi continued to be produced by fermentation of fish with rice, the addition of rice vinegar greatly reduced the time of fermentation.

It is commonly described as "a cross between blue cheese, fish, and rice vinegar". A story from Konjaku Monogatarishū written in early 12th century makes it clear that it was not an attractive smell, even if it tasted good.

Fish meat was marinated in soy sauce or vinegar, or was heavily salted so there was no need to dip into soy sauce. Some fish was cooked before it was put onto a sushi. This was partly out of necessity as there were no refrigerators. Each piece was also larger, almost the size of two pieces of today's sushi. Raw salmon flesh for example may contain marine parasites such as Anisakis nematodes, that cause anisakiasis. Before the availability of refrigeration, Japan did not consume raw salmon for this health risk. Salmon and salmon roe have only recently come into use in making sashimi (raw fish) and sushi in the late 1980s. The introduction was from parasite-free Norwegian salmon belonging from Norwegian fishing companies who had an oversupply of farmed fish and were looking for a country to sell it off to. A deal resulted with Japanese company Nishi Rei for 5000 tons of salmon which started salmon sushi consumption in Japan.

is a rare type of  prepared near Lake Biwa, Shiga Prefecture. Eighteen generations of the Kitamura family have been preparing the dish at Kitashina since 1619.

Fresh  are scaled and gutted through their gills or throat keeping the body (and always the roe) of the fish intact. The fish are then packed with salt and aged for a year before being repacked annually in fermented rice for up to four years. The resulting fermented dish may be served sliced thin or used as an ingredient in other dishes.

Authentic  is made from a wild subspecies of goldfish called  (a wild type of Carassius auratus) endemic to the lake. It is technically misleading to say that "crucian carp" is used, as though any -type carp in the genus may be substituted, especially since the true crucian carp is a distinct species altogether (C. carassius) and is not indigenous to Lake Biwa.

The term  was first used in the book , published in 1749. However, this dish did not resemble the current-day , but was instead seafood rolled with bamboo mat. Roll the  tightly from one side". A later book  describes the process of making : "Spread  on the board, place the sushi rice on it. Roll them firmly".

Sushi and Western culture 
The Oxford English Dictionary notes the earliest written mention of sushi in an 1893 book, Japanese Interiors, where it mentions that "Domestics served us with tea and sushi or rice sandwiches". However, there is also mention of sushi in a Japanese-English dictionary from 1873, and an 1879 article on Japanese cookery in the journal Notes and Queries. Additionally, the 1879 best-selling book A Tour Around the World by General Grant by James Dabney McCabe describes former president Ulysses S. Grant dining on the "shashimi" [sic] version of sushi during his visit to Japan.

United States 

Sushi was already being served in the United States by the early 1900s, following an influx of Japanese immigration after the Meiji Restoration. The first sushi shop in the U.S. reportedly opened in 1906 in the Little Tokyo neighborhood of Los Angeles. H.D. Miller, food historian of Lipscomb University has written that a wave of Japanophilia in American high society resulted in the serving of sushi at social functions. Popularity of Japanese food peaked around 1905 when it was being served at Japanese-themed social gatherings across the United States, including in midwestern cities such as Minneapolis, Minnesota, St. Louis, Missouri and Bismarck, North Dakota. According to Miller, the earliest published mention of sushi eaten by an American, in America, was an 18 August 1904 article in the Los Angeles Herald about a luncheon served in Santa Monica by the socialite Fern Dell Higgins.

Several years later, a wave of anti-Japanese nativism sentiments and restrictions on Japanese immigration, starting with the Gentlemen's Agreement of 1907, caused a subsequent decline in the acceptance of Japanese cuisine. After the outbreak of World War II, Japanese-American restaurants on the West Coast were generally forced to close and sell off their businesses due to internment orders on their proprietors. One restaurant that reopened after the war to serve sushi was Matsuno Sushi (Matsu-no-sushi) in Little Tokyo, Los Angeles. This restaurant had been in business at least since 1938 or 1939, and by 1949, it was back serving sushi (featuring local bluefin tuna) for lunch. But the maki and inari they served was not shaped by hand by trained chefs, but molded in cookie-cutters.

The Kawafuku restaurant in Little Tokyo has been credited with being the "first true sushi bar" in the United States, that is to say, the first to serve sushi from a trained sushi chef in the country. Some sources accept the claim made by a man named Noritoshi Kanai that he was the person instrumental in persuading Kawafuku's owner to start the sushi section. Kanai has also claimed to be the person who coined the term "sushi bar". Kanai headed the Tokyo-based arm of Mutual Trading, an importer of Japanese food ingredients that served Kawafuku and other restaurants. The first sushi chef in America according to this account was Shigeo Saito, and some sources paint the chef as the principal figure who brought real sushi to the U.S.

Articles that gave positive views of tourism to Japan and Japanese cuisine began appearing in the media in the United States in the 1950s, paving the way to the public accepting different kinds of Japanese cuisine.

Though the true origin is disputed, many believe the California roll was invented in Los Angeles by substituting a slice of avocado for the seasonal toro (fatty tuna) in a traditional maki roll.

United Kingdom 
A report of sushi being consumed in Britain occurred when the then Crown Prince Akihito (born 1933) visited Queen Elizabeth II at the time of her Coronation in May 1953.

Canada 
Although sushi was first served in Canada with the first arrivals of Japanese immigrants during the 19th century, it was not until changes to immigration rules in the 1960s that it started becoming widely available. Vancouver in particular went from 3 sushi outlets in 1976 to more than 600 in 2014, a larger number per capita than in Canada's largest city Toronto. Although the true origin is disputed, it's widely believed that Chef Hidekazu invented the California roll (originally called "Tojo-maki") in Vancouver, by inverting the roll and putting rice on the outside to make it more accessible to Western tastes, and adding non-traditional ingredients like avocado. The B.C. roll was also invented in Vancouver by Hidekazu in 1974 using barbecued salmon.

Australia 
Australia is a major source of rice used in sushi, in particular Leeton, New South Wales, which is the headquarters of SunRice.

Sushi is believed to have been introduced into Australia between the early 1970s and the 1980s. The first known sushi conveyor belt in Australia appeared in Queensland in 1993, when Sushi Train opened its first restaurant.

New Zealand 
When David Bowie played in Auckland in 1983 as part of the Serious Moonlight Tour, it was rumoured his contract rider stated that sushi be on the menu, which at the time was rare and exotic in New Zealand, and typically served only in high-end city restaurants.

St Pierre's, a nationwide food franchise, officially began serving sushi in 1993, after originally being established as a seafood delicatessen in Wellington in 1984.

Etymology 
The Japanese name "sushi" is written with kanji (Chinese characters) for ancient Chinese dishes which bear little resemblance to today's sushi.

One of these might have been a salted, pickled fish. The first use of "鮨" appeared in The Face and Hand, the oldest Chinese dictionary believed to be written around the third century BC. It is explained as "Those made with fish [are called] 鮨, those made with meat [are called] 醢". The term "醢" refers to a fermented meat made from salted minced pork and "鮨" is a salted, minced, and fermented fish. The Chinese character "鮨" is believed to have a much earlier origin, but this is the earliest recorded instance of that character being associated with food. "鮨" was not associated with rice.

See also 

 Burong isda
 Pla ra
 Japanese cuisine
 Chinese cuisine
 Food history

References 
Citations

Bibliography

 - Alternate URL  at the White Rose University Consortium

 - See page 91

External links 
History of Sushi
Sushi Dictionary (寿司用語辞典; in Japanese)
Sushi Q & A (すしのQ&A; in Japanese)
The History of Sushi.

Sushi